"Puppy Love" and "Sleigh Ride" are two songs by British pop group S Club Juniors, released as a double A-side single and as the fourth single from their debut album, Together (2002). "Puppy Love" is a cover of the 1960 Paul Anka song while "Sleigh Ride" is a cover of the 1948 song written by Leroy Anderson and Mitchell Parish. "Puppy Love" / "Sleigh Ride" was issued on 9 December 2002, peaking at number six on the UK Singles Chart. The single was the group's first and only double-A-side.

Composition
Calvin Goldspink is on lead vocals for "Puppy Love". Frankie Sandford, Aaron Renfree, Stacey McClean, Rochelle Wiseman, Daisy Evans, Hannah Richings and Jay Asforis do not have any solos in this song.

Music videos
The video for "Puppy Love" features Goldspink looking through a Rachel Stevens calendar and making a snow stature shaped like her whilst the others are playing in the snow. Later the band are indoors decorating the house with decorations before finding their presents were Goldspink finds a present for him from Stevens: a puppy. At the end of the video words come up saying, "Remember a dog is for life, Not just for Christmas."

The video for "Sleigh Ride" features clips from the previous video with the band playing in the snow and the lyrics to song appear to sing-a-long to.

Track listings
UK CD single
 "Puppy Love"
 "Sleigh Ride"
 "Sleigh Ride" (karaoke version)
 "Puppy Love" (video)

UK cassette single
 "Puppy Love"
 "Sleigh Ride"
 "Puppy Love" (karaoke version)

Credits and personnel

"Puppy Love"
Credits are lifted from the Together album booklet.

Studio
 Mastered at Transfermation (London, England)

Personnel
 Paul Anka – writing
 Paul Gendler – guitars
 Nick Ingman – string and brass arrangement
 Isobel Griffiths Ltd. – string contracting
 Jewels & Stone – production
 Tim "Spag" Speight – mixing
 Richard Dowling – mastering

"Sleigh Ride"
Credits are lifted from the UK CD single liner notes.

Studio
 Mastered at Transfermation (London, England)

Personnel
 Leroy Anderson – writing
 Mitchell Parish – writing
 James Nisbet – guitars
 Nick Ingman – string and brass arrangement
 Isobel Griffiths Ltd. – string contracting
 Jewels & Stone – production
 Tim "Spag" Speight – mixing
 Richard Dowling – mastering

Charts

See also
 Puppy Love (Paul Anka song)
 Sleigh Ride

References

19 Recordings singles
2002 singles
2002 songs
Polydor Records singles
S Club 8 songs
Songs written by Paul Anka